Sakkiassee Anaija (1913–1980) was an Inuit artist. Anaija was known for his carvings in whalebone, antler, stone and ivory. Anaija was born in the Netsilik territory of the Northwest Territories.

His work is included in the collections of the National Gallery of Canada, the Carleton University Art Gallery and the Winnipeg Art Gallery.

References

 1913 births
 1980 deaths
20th-century Canadian artists
Inuit artists